Ahmad Asyraaf bin Omar (born 12 September 1994) is a Malaysian footballer who plays as a goalkeeper for Malaysia Super League club Kelantan United.

References

External links
 

1996 births
Living people
Malaysian footballers
Malaysia Super League players
PKNP FC players
Kuala Lumpur Rovers F.C. players
Penang F.C. players
Melaka United F.C. players
Kelantan United F.C. players
Association football goalkeepers